Rudsar County is in Gilan province, Iran. The capital of the county is the city of Rudsar. At the 2006 census, the county's population was 144,576 in 42,004 households. The following census in 2011 counted 144,366 people in 46,357 households. At the 2016 census, the county's population was 147,399 in 51,586 households.

Administrative divisions

The population history and structural changes of Rudsar County's administrative divisions over three consecutive censuses are shown in the following table. The latest census shows four districts, 10 rural districts, and five cities.

References

 

Counties of Gilan Province